Always Further On is a 1965 Mexican drama film directed by Luis Alcoriza. It won the FIPRESCI Prize at the 1965 Cannes Film Festival. The film was also selected as the Mexican entry for the Best Foreign Language Film at the 38th Academy Awards, but was not accepted as a nominee.

Cast
 Ignacio López Tarso
 Jaime Fernández
 Aurora Clavel
 Eric del Castillo
 Berta Castillón
 Pancho Córdova
 Regino Herrera

See also
 List of submissions to the 38th Academy Awards for Best Foreign Language Film
 List of Mexican submissions for the Academy Award for Best Foreign Language Film

References

External links

1965 films
1960s Spanish-language films
1965 drama films
Mexican black-and-white films
Films directed by Luis Alcoriza
Indigenous cinema in Latin America
Mexican drama films
1960s Mexican films